Gioacchino is a masculine Italian given name, equivalent to the English Joachim. Notable people with the name include:

 Gioacchino Assereto (1600–1649), Italian painter
 Gioacchino Cocchi (1720–1804), Italian composer
 Gioacchino Colombo (1903–1988), Italian automobile engine designer
 Gioacchino Conti (1714–1761), Italian soprano castrato opera singer
 Gioacchino La Barbera (born 1959), member of the Mafia who became a pentito
 Gioacchino La Lomia (1831–1905), priest of the Order of Friars Minor Capuchin, a missionary and a preacher
 Gioacchino Livigni, tenor opera singer
 Gioacchino Navarro (1748–1813), the Conventional Parish Priest of the Order of St. John, Malta
 Gioacchino Pecci (1810–1903), Italian pope
 Gioacchino Prati (1790–1863), Italian revolutionary and patriot
Gioacchino Toma (1836–1891), Italian painter
 Gioacchino Ventura di Raulica, Italian Roman Catholic pulpit orator, patriot, philosopher and writer

See also 
 Gioachino
 Santi Gioacchino ed Anna al Tuscolano, church on the Via Monte Polacco in Rome

Italian masculine given names